Olha Petrivna Kosach (29 June 1849 – 4 October 1930), better known by her pen name Olena Pchilka, was a Ukrainian publisher, writer, ethnographer, interpreter, and civil activist. She was the sister of Mykhailo Drahomanov and the mother of Lesya Ukrainka, Olha Kosach-Kryvyniuk, Mykhailo Kosach, Oksana Kosach-Shymanovska, Mykola Kosach, Izydora Kosach-Borysova and Yuriy Kosach.

Early years
Pchilka was born in Hadiach, into the family of a local landowner, Petro Drahomanov. She received a basic education at home and completed her education at the Exemplary Boarding School of Noble Maidens (Kyiv) in 1866. She married Petro Kosach sometime in 1868 and soon moved to Novohrad-Volynskyi, where he worked. Her daughters Lesya Ukrainka was born there. Pchilka is, perhaps, the most well-known Ukrainian female poet. She died in Kyiv, aged 81.

Pchilka recorded folk songs, folk customs, and rites, and collected folk embroidery in Volhynia, later publishing her research.

She published numerous works, and was active in the feminist movement, particularly in cooperation with Nataliya Kobrynska with whom she published an almanac in Lemberg "Pershyi Vinok".

Activity 
She began her career by translating poetry by Pushkin and Lermontov. With the publication of her book Ukrainian Folk Ornament in Kyiv in 1876, Olena Pchilka became known as the first expert in this type of folk art in Ukraine.  In 1880, Pchilka published Stepan Rudansky's Songs at her own expense, and a year later a collection of her translations from the works of Gogol, Pushkin, and Lermontov, To Ukrainian Children (1881), was published.  In 1883, she began publishing poems and stories in the Lviv magazine Zorya, her first being the collection of poems Thoughts of a Net (1886).  At the same time, she took an active part in the Ukrainian women's movement; in 1887, together with Natalia Kobrynska, she published the almanac "The First Wreath" in Lviv.

Interpreter
Pchilka also was an interpreter and translated into the Ukrainian language many famous works, such as those of Nikolai Gogol, Adam Mickiewicz, Alexander Pushkin and others.

Works
Among the most prominent of her works are the following:
 "Tovaryshky" (Comradesses, 1887),
 "Svitlo dobra i lyubovi"(The light of goodness and love, 1888),
 "Soloviovyi spiv" (Nightingale singing, 1889),
 "Za pravdoyu" (For a truth, 1889),
 "Artyshok" (Artichoke, 1907),
 "Pivtora oseledsya" (One and a half herring, 1908),
 a play "Suzhena ne ohuzhena" (1881),
 a play "Svitova rich" (World thing, 1908) and others.

References

External links

Olena Pchilka at the Encyclopedia of Ukraine

1849 births
1930 deaths
People from Hadiach
People from Gadyachsky Uyezd
Ukrainian non-fiction writers
Ukrainian women poets
Ukrainian feminists
Ukrainian ethnographers
Ukrainian publishers (people)
Ukrainian dramatists and playwrights
Ukrainian women anthropologists
Burials at Baikove Cemetery
19th-century pseudonymous writers
20th-century pseudonymous writers